Cynarctina is an extinct clade of the Borophaginae subfamily of canids native to North America.
Cynarctines had rounded cusps on the molar teeth, similar to those seen in living bears, suggesting that they were likely omnivores.

References

 
Miocene canids
Prehistoric mammals of North America
Animal subtribes